Destination: Sun  is the fourth album by Dayton, Ohio  funk band  Sun

Track listing
Radiation Level 	5:55 	
Pure Fire 	5:08 	
I Want To Be With You 	4:47 	
Everybody Disco Down 	3:32 	
Light Of The Universe 	4:52 	
Deep Rooted Feeling (Stand Up) 	4:58 	
Baby I Confess 	4:02 	
Hallelujah Spirit 	4:43

Personnel
Byron Byrd - Lead and Backing Vocals, Bass, Piano, Keyboards, Percussion, Flute, Trombone, Alto, Baritone and Soporano Saxophone
Kym Yancey - Drums, Percussion, Backing Vocals
Keith Cheatham - Lead and Backing Vocals, Lead Guitar, Trombone, Percussion
Curtis Hooks - Bass, Alto Saxophone, Lead and Backing Vocals
Gary King - Trombone, Backing Vocals
Robert Arnold - Trumpet, Backing Vocals
Nigel Boulton - Trumpet, Flugelhorn, Piano, Backing Vocals

Production
Shusei Nagaoka - cover art

Charts

Singles

External links
 Sun-Destination: Sun at Discogs

References

1979 albums
Sun (R&B band) albums
Capitol Records albums
Albums with cover art by Shusei Nagaoka